Fashion 4K is a 24-hour New York City-based satellite television channel broadcast in Europe that operates under the Fashion One television network. The channel was officially launched in New York City on September 1, 2015, and is the first English language free-to-air channel to be broadcast in 4K resolution (or Ultra High Definition) in Europe. Fashion One also officially launched its sister channel Fashion One 4K in Asia, Latin America and North America as the first true international launch of a UHD channel. Both channels operate under Fashion One's network which is owned by Bigfoot Entertainment. As of September 1, 2015, approximately 116 million households across Europe received Fashion 4K via SES S.A.'s Astra 19.2ºE satellite. Since December 2016 it became received via Eutelsat's Hot bird13°E satellite .

Fashion 4K's corporate office are located in the Fashion One, One Astor Plaza, 1515 Broadway, Times Square neighborhood of Manhattan in New York City while studio and production facility are located in the Harper's Bazaar, Hearst Tower, 300 West 57th Street or 959 Eighth Avenue, near Columbus Circle, Midtown Manhattan neighborhood of Manhattan in New York City, and its transmitter is located at the Empire State Building and One World Trade Center.

Formal launch

Fashion One 4K 
Fashion One 4K was officially launched in Asia, Latin America and North America at the same time as Fashion 4K via MEASAT-3a, NSS-806 and SES-3 respectively.

Fashion One Network 
Fashion 4K operates under the Fashion One television network along with Fashion One 4K. Before Fashion 4K, Fashion One launched Fashion One HD and Fashion First both local variants of the network.

Pre-History 

Fashion One began updating its production format from HD to Ultra HD in 2014.

Programming 

Fashion 4K's original purpose was to play 4K resolution fashion content 24 hours a day, seven days a week. Though the channel identifies primarily as a fashion channel, the channel's programming also covers lifestyle and entertainment. Fashion 4K's programming is made up of original series, featured programs and footage from a network of content providers. All footage is shot in 4K resolution.

Original Series 
Fashion 4K's original series have been adapted from shows that were broadcast on the Fashion One channel for 4K resolution output.

Fashion On A Plate 

This docu-series originally aired on the Fashion One channel on June 26, 2014, and returns for its second season on Fashion 4K. This series explores the relationship between food and fashion and challenges restaurants and chefs to combine the two industries on one plate.

Model Yoga 

Model Yoga is a lifestyle series that also returns for its second season on Fashion 4K. The show originally aired on January 2, 2011.

Eco Fashion 

Eco Fashion is a documentary series that highlights the industry of sustainable fashion. The show first aired on Fashion One on October 15, 2012, and returns for its third season on Fashion 4K.

See also 
 Fashion One
 Bigfoot Entertainment

References

Television channels and stations established in 2015
2015 establishments in Europe
Fashion-related television channels
4K television channels